Lali County is in Khuzestan province, Iran. The capital of the county is the city of Lali. At the 2006 census, the county's population was 35,549 in 6,341 households. The following census in 2011 counted 37,381 people in 7,964 households. At the 2016 census the county's population was 37,963, in 9,200 households.

Administrative divisions

The population history of Lali County's administrative divisions over three consecutive censuses is shown in the following table. The latest census shows two districts, four rural districts, and one city.

References

 

Counties of Khuzestan Province